The Dallara F398 is an open-wheel formula racing talian manufacturer Dallara, for Formula Three categories, in 1998.

References 

Dallara racing cars
Formula Three cars